Events in the year 2020 in Iran.

Incumbents
 Supreme Leader of Iran: Ali Khamenei
 President of Iran: Hassan Rouhani
 Chairman of the Parliament: Ali Larijani (until 28 May), Mohammad Bagher Ghalibaf (from 28 May)
 Judiciary System of Iran: Ebrahim Raisi

Events

January

 January 3 – A U.S. coordinated airstrike near Baghdad International Airport kills Iranian military leader Qasem Soleimani.
January 7 – A stampede at the burial procession of Qasem Soleimani killed at least 56 people and injured over 200.
 January 8
 Ballistic missiles from Iran strike two United States military bases in Iraq.
 Ukraine International Airlines Flight 752 crashes after being shot down by Iranian missiles near Tehran shortly after take-off with 176 passengers and crew on board. All 176 passengers and crew died.
 January 9 – A bus crashes in Mazandaran Province, killing at least 20 passengers and injuring 24 others.
 January 11 – the British Ambassador to Iran is arrested and released shortly after.
 January 12
Hundreds of Iranians attend anti-government protest after government admits shooting down a Ukrainian airplane due to human error.
Kimia Alizadeh, who won a bronze medal in Taekwondo during the 2016 Summer Olympics, has defected to an undisclosed country. It is unclear if she will compete in the 2020 Summer Olympics
 January 22
 Masked gunmen kill local security leader, Abdolhossein Mojaddami, head of a unit of the Revolutionary Guard.

February
19 February – The first case of COVID-19 is confirmed in Qom, marking the beginning of the pandemic in the country.
21 February – Scheduled date for the 2020 Iranian legislative election.
23 February – 2020 Khoy earthquake
29 February – 43 people have died and 593 are infected with COVID-19.

May
 10 May – an anti-ship missile fired from the  hit the support vessel , killing 19 and wounding 15 of the crew of the Konarak.

June
 25  June - The first of the 2020 Iran explosions occurs
 26 June - An explosion occurred at a Shahid Bakeri Industrial Group facility outside of Tehran, which houses the Khojir missile facility.

July
 2 July - The Natanz incident occurred, wherein the centrifuge assembly center at the Natanz nuclear site was destroyed.

December
 3 December - Iran surpasses 1 million cases of COVID-19.

Deaths

3 January – Qasem Soleimani, 62, major general, commander of the Quds Force (b. 1957)
19 February – Yervand Manaryan, 95, actor (b. 1924)
27 February – Hadi Khosroshahi, 81, cleric and diplomat (b. 1939)
28 February
Mahmoud Khayami, 90, industrialist and philanthropist (b. 1930)
Malakeh Ranjbar, 81, actress, (b. 1939)
1 March – Siamand Rahman, 31, powerlifter, paralympic champion (b. 1988)
3 March – Ahmad NikTalab, 85, poet, author, and linguistic (b. 1934)
5 March – Hossein Sheikholesam, 67, politician, (b. 1952)
4 March - Eskandar Firouz, 93, environmentalist and politician (b. 1926)
7 March
Fatemeh Rahbar, 55, politician, member-elect of the parliament, (b.  1964)
Houshang Zarif, 81, tar player, heart failure (b. 1938)
13 March – Nasser Shabani, 62–63, brigadier general, commander of the Islamic Revolutionary Guard Corps (b. 1957)
15 March – Mohammad Ami-Tehrani, 84, olympic weightlifter (b. 1935)
16 March – 
Hashem Bathaie Golpayenagi, 78–79, cleric, member of the Assembly of Experts (b. 1941)
Fariborz Raisdana, 75, economist (b. 1948)
19 March – Hamid Kohram, 61–62, politician (b.  1958)
22 March – Behrouz Rahbar, 74, olympic racing cyclist (b. 1945)
23 March - Hassan Akbarzadeh, 93, researcher and mathematician (b. 1927)
24 March - Abbasgholi Daneshvar, 95, physician and surgeon (b. 1925)
25 March –
Edman Ayvazyan, 87, painter (b. 1932)
Farzaneh Taidi, 74, actress (b. 1945)
27 March – Daniel Gevargiz, 79, olympic weightlifter (b. 1940)
30 March - Kioumars Darembakhsh, 74, writer and photographer (b. 1945)
5 April - Homayoun Khosravi, 66, musician (b. 1953)
11 April - Pari Mansouri, 85, writer and translator (b. 1935)
15 April - Siamak Shayeghi, 65, film director and producer (b. 1954)
24 April - Ebrahim Amini, 94, cleric and politician, member of the Assembly of Experts (b. 1925)
26 April - Abolfazl Salabi, 95, basketball player (b. 1924)
4 May - Najaf Daryabandari, 90, writer (b. 1929)
16 May - Hossein Kazempour Ardebili, 67–6, politician and diplomat (b. 1952)
25 May - Sedigheh Kianfar, 87, actress (b. 1933)
5 June - Marjan, 71, singer and actress (b. 1948)
6 June - Mehdi Nikbakht, 40, poet and daf player (b. 1970)
9 June - Parviz Aboutaleb, 77–78, footballer and coach (b. 1942)
14 June - Mohammad-Ali Keshavarz, 90, actor (b. 1930)
19 June - Alborz Zarei, 38, climber and environmentalist (b. 1982)
19 June - Gholamreza Mansouri, 54, judge (b. 1966)
27 June - David Stronach, 89, archaeologist of ancient Iran (b. 1931)
1 July - Sirous Gorjestani, 75, actor (b. 1944)
8 July - Houshang Seddigh, 72, pilot and commander of the Air Force (b. 1948)
14 July - Abolghasem Sarhaddizadeh, 75, politician (b. 1945)
18 July - Ali Mirzaei, 91, weightlifter (b. 1929)
18 July - Saeed Ghaemmaghami, 76, journalist (b. 1944)
20 July - Ahmad Pourmokhber, 79, actor (b. 1940)
28 July - Badr al-Zamān Qarīb, 90, linguist (b. 1929)
1 August - Khosrow Sinai, 79, film director (b. 1941)
3 August - Mohammad Reza Navaei, 71, wrestler (b. 1948)
7 August - Mahchehreh Khalili, 43, actress (b. 1977)
16 August - Bahman Mofid, 78, actor (b. 1942)
18 August - Mohammad-Ali Taskhiri, 75, cleric and politician, member of the Assembly of Experts (b. 1944)
25 August - Ruhollah Hosseinian, 64, cleric and politician (b. 1956)
27 August - Siah Armajani, 81, sculptor and architect (b. 1939)
29 August - Serjik Teymourian, 46, footballer (b. 1974)
31 August - Farhad Ahmadi, 69, architecture (b. 1950)
12 September - Yousef Saanei, 82, cleric (b. 1937)
12 September - Navid Afkari, 26-27, wrestler (b. 1993)
18 September - Talat Basari, 97, writer and academic (b. 1923)
30 September - Abbas Javanmard, 91, actor and director (b. 1928)
1 October - Manouchehr Ashtiani, 89, sociologist (b. 1929)
6 October - Nosratollah Vahdat, 95, actor and director (b. 1925)
8 October - Mohammad Reza Shajarian, 80, singer (b. 1940)
12 October - Sadegh Malek Shahmirzadi, 80, archaeologist (b. 1940)
13 October - Akbar A'lami, 75, TV presenter (b. 1944)
16 October - Gholam-Abbas Tavassoli, 85, sociologist (b. 1935)
18 October - Laleh Bakhtiar, 82, translator (b. 1938)
24 October - Abbas Moayeri, 81, painter (b. 1939)
29 October - Karim Akbari Mobarakeh, 67, actor (b. 1953)
31 October - Jalal Malaksha, 69, poet (b. 1951)
8 November - Heidar Shonjani, 74, swimmer (b. 1945)
10 November - Mahmoud Yavari, 81, football coach (b. 1939)
10 November - Amir Yavari, 88, boxer (b. 1931)
22 November - Changiz Jalilvand, 82, dubler (b. 1938)
24 November - Kambuzia Partovi, 65, film director (b. 1955)
24 November - Mohammad Khadem, 85, wrestler (b. 1935)
27 November - Parviz Poorhosseini, 79, actor (b. 1941)
27 November - Mohsen Fakhrizadeh, 59, physician (b. 1961)
28 November - Mohammad-Ali Shahidi, 71, cleric and politician (b. 1949)
29 November - Ramesh, 74, singer and actress (b. 1946)
1 December - Ali-Asghar Shahbazi, 98, actor (b. 1922)
1 December - Mohammad Maleki, 87, writer and human rights activist (b. 1933)
9 December - Mohammad Yazdi, 89, cleric and politician (b. 1931)
12 December - Ruhollah Zam, 42, journalist (b. 1978)

References 

 
Iran
Iran
2020s in Iran
Years of the 21st century in Iran